"That Old Black Magic" is a 1942 popular song.

That Old Black Magic may also refer to:
 That Old Black Magic (album), a 1965 album by Keely Smith
 "That Old Black Magic" (Charmed), an episode of Charmed
 "That Old Black Magic" (The Fairly OddParents), an episode of The Fairly OddParents
 "That Old Black Magic" (Farscape), an episode of Farscape
 "That Old Black Magic" (The Goodies), an episode of The Goodies
 "That Old Black Magic" (Sea of Souls), an episode of Sea of Souls